Kevin Jon Vanhoozer (born March 10, 1957) is an American theologian and current Research Professor of Systematic Theology at Trinity Evangelical Divinity School (TEDS) in Deerfield, Illinois. Much of Vanhoozer's work focuses on systematic theology, hermeneutics, and postmodernism.

Biography 
Vanhoozer received his M. Div. from Westminster Theological Seminary in Philadelphia and a Ph.D. from Cambridge University, where he studied under Nicholas Lash. His interdisciplinary dissertation was titled Biblical Narrative in the Philosophy of Paul Ricoeur: A Study in Hermeneutics and Theology, published in 1990 (reprint 2007) by Cambridge University Press.

He joined the faculty of Trinity Evangelical Divinity School in 1986, but during two periods since has taught elsewhere. From 1990 to 1998, he was Senior Lecturer at New College, University of Edinburgh; from 2009 to 2012, he was Blanchard Professor of Theology at Wheaton College. He returned to TEDS in 2012.

Vanhoozer is the Senior Theological Mentor for the St. Augustine Fellowship of the Center for Pastor Theologians and Senior Fellow in Systematic Theology for the C. S. Lewis Institute. He and his wife Sylvie have two daughters. He maintains a web page, "The Theophilus Project", at www.kevinjvanhoozer.com. 

Douglas Sweeney and Daniel Treier edited a Festschrift in his honor, Hearing and Doing the Word: The Drama of Evangelical Hermeneutics, published in 2021 by T&T Clark and consisting of essays by his former teachers and students and present colleagues.

Academic contributions 
Vanhoozer has written several books, including The Drama of Doctrine: A Canonical-Linguistic Approach to Christian Theology, which won the Christianity Today 2006 Book Award for best book in theology, and Faith Speaking Understanding: Performing the Drama of Doctrine, which won the Christianity Today 2015 Book Award for best book in theology. He has edited several others, including the Gold Medallion Book Award winner Dictionary for Theological Interpretation of the Bible, The Cambridge Companion to Postmodern Theology, and, with Charles A. Anderson and Michael J. Sleasman, Everyday Theology:  How to Read Cultural Texts and Interpret Trends.

In his work Is There a Meaning in this Text?, Vanhoozer gives an in-depth response to the challenges of Deconstructionism to biblical hermeneutics. Primarily, he engages the thinking of Jacques Derrida, but Stanley Fish and Richard Rorty also receive attention. Vanhoozer develops a theory of communicative action that relies strongly on the speech-act theory of J. L. Austin, in which a biblical text is seen as a communicative act involving "locutions" (the text itself), "illocutions" (the stance of the author to the locution, e.g. questioning, asserting, promising, etc.), and "perlocutions" (the goals that the author hopes to accomplish through the text).

Among the conclusions that Vanhoozer draws from viewing a text as a communicative act are the involvement of the author, text, and reader in the process of interpretation. The intended meaning of the author can be discerned to a certain degree from the text. The text (langue and parole) is not an arbitrary "playground" but part of a covenantal relationship between all people. As a result, the intention of the author can be adequately decoded. Another consequence is that the reader/interpreter has a responsibility to honor the intentions of the author and try to interpret the text in a way which re-creates the author's intended meaning. This responsibility is coupled with a freedom to determine the significance in the context of the interpreter's community.

Works

Books

Edited works

Articles

Online writings
 The Promise of Consensus: Towards a Communicative Hermeneutic (PDF)
 Types of Postmodern Theology (PDF), an excerpt from the Cambridge Companion to Postmodern Theology. Archived from the original on 8 August 2017
 Hyperactive Hermeneutics: Is the Bible Being Overinterpreted?
 Vanhoozer's response to Kostenberger's review of The Drama of Doctrine

Audio
 The Stage, the Story and the Script (MP3), Asbury Theological Seminary, March 15, 2007
 Doing Church: The Theater of the Gospel (MP3), Asbury Seminary, March 16, 2007
 The Strange New Status Symbol of the Cross (MP3), Wheaton College, March 19, 2008
 What has Vienna to do with Jerusalem? Barth, Brahms, and Bernstein's Unanswered Question (RealMedia)

References

External links 
Kevin J. Vanhoozer, PhD—Research Professor of Systematic Theology, Trinity Evangelical Divinity School.
Anon, "Experience the Drama" (PDF), Trinity Magazine, Spring 2006.
Davies, G., "The Kevin Vanhoozer Interview", Exiled Preacher, September 21, 2007.
Poythress, V., Book Review: Is There a Meaning in This Text?, Westminster Theological Journal, June 2, 2012.
 Blue, S. A., "Meaning, intention, and application: Speech act theory in the hermeneutics of Francis Watson and Kevin J. Vanhoozer", Trinity Journal, Fall 2002.

Westminster Theological Seminary alumni
Alumni of the University of Cambridge
American Calvinist and Reformed theologians
Trinity International University faculty
Living people
1957 births
Wheaton College (Illinois) faculty
Academics of the University of Edinburgh
20th-century Calvinist and Reformed theologians
21st-century Calvinist and Reformed theologians
Hermeneutists
Critics of atheism